Søstrene Islands is a group of small islands and rocks that rise above the northern part of the Publications Ice Shelf at the head of Prydz Bay. They were discovered and charted in February 1935 by Captain Klarius Mikkelsen in the Norwegian whaling ship Thorshavn, sent out by Lars Christensen. They gave the name Søstrene after the islands by that name lying in the entrance to the Oslofjord, Norway.

The Søstrene Islands include Debutante Island.

See also 
 List of antarctic and sub-antarctic islands

References

Islands of Princess Elizabeth Land